Fokstuguhøi is a mountain in Dovre Municipality in Innlandet county, Norway. The mountain is surrounded by several other notable mountains including Storhøe to the east, Halvfarhøe and Gråhøe to the northeast, and Falketind and Blåberget to the north-northeast.

Climate
The climate around the village is borderline Subarctic climate (Dfc). Although the wet season is in summer, the driest time of year is in late spring. An extra  in October would give it 3 times the precipitation of April. This would make Fokstugu a Subarctic climate (Dsc). The warmest month, July, has an average of only  making it on the border with a tundra climate (Et).

See also
List of mountains of Norway

References

Dovre
Mountains of Innlandet